Epçiler is a village the Bartın District, Bartın Province, Turkey. Its population is 1,157 (2021). It is situated in a low valley between two chain mountains running parallel to Black Sea coast. The name of the village may be a corrupt form of the word ipçiler meaning "ropemaker"s  of the past .

References

Villages in Bartın District